Microraptoria (Greek, μίκρος, mīkros: "small"; Latin, raptor: "one who seizes") is a clade of basal dromaeosaurid theropod dinosaurs. The first microraptorians appeared 125 million years ago in China. Many are known for long feathers on their legs and may have been semiarboreal powered fliers, some of which were even capable of launching from the ground.

Description

Microraptorians were a group of basal dromaeosaurids (popularly known as "raptors") with slender proportions and long limbs. With the exception of Hesperonychus from the late Cretaceous of North America, all microraptorians have been found in the Yixian and Jifuotang Formations of Liaoning County, China, hence why microraptorians are sometimes referred to as "Liaoning dromaeosaurs". These formations (collectively known as the Jehol group) have been dated to the early Cretaceous and at that time would have been part of a temperate wetland ecosystem threatened by frequent volcanic eruptions. Like other dromaeosaurids, microraptorians were carnivores with relatively large, serrated teeth and a hyperextendable second toe equipped with a curved claw.

Size and proportions

Most microraptorians were small dinosaurs, with taxa such as Microraptor and especially Zhongjianosaurus being among the smallest nonavian dinosaurs known. However, some microraptorians, such as Tianyuraptor and Changyuraptor, were larger and similar to other dromaeosaurids in size. Many microraptorians also had long and robust arms and legs, in contrast to the stockier eudromaeosaurs, although long arms are not universal to the group, since the basal microraptorian Tianyuraptor had unusually short arms by dromaeosaurid standards. Considering this, the small size and long wings of some microraptorians likely are  examples of convergent evolution with other small paravians and early birds such as Anchiornis and Archaeopteryx.

Feathers
The fossilization conditions of the Jehol group are very accommodating to the preservation of soft structures in fossils, and as a result, many microraptorians have been preserved with a covering of feathers. Not only have long, advanced feathers been preserved on the arms and tails of many specimens, but a few species even have long feathers on their legs. This condition has also been seen in other paravians such as Anchiornis, and has caused these kinds of dinosaurs to be labelled as "four-winged dinosaurs". The largest known "four-winged" dinosaur, Changyuraptor, is a microraptorian. Some microraptorians such as Microraptor possibly were able to use these wings to glide or take off from the ground.

Characteristic features
Microraptorines can be distinguished from other dromaeosaurids by these features:
 A maxilla laterally sculpted by small pits
 A very short manual phalanx III-2
 A shortened first digit of the hand
 A splatulate (rounded) pubic symphysis
 A metatarsal III with a pinched proximal end
 A slender metatarsal II
In addition, several features are present in microraptorines with the exception of Tianyuraptor, which is believed to be a basal member of the clade:
 A large oval fenestra in the coracoid
 Significantly shortened penultimate manual phalanges
 The posterior end of the ilium extending ventral to the ischial peduncle
 Lateral projections halfway down the pubis
 A strongly anteriorly curved pubic shaft

Classification

Microraptoria is usually classified as a clade of dromaeosaurids. Senter and colleagues expressly coined the name without the subfamily suffix -inae to avoid perceived issues with erecting a traditional family-group taxon, should the group be found to lie outside the Dromaeosauridae proper. Sereno offered a revised definition of the subgroup containing Microraptor to ensure that it would fall within the Dromaeosauridae, and erected the subfamily Microraptorinae, attributing it to Senter et al., though this usage has only appeared on his online TaxonSearch database and has not been formally published.

The cladogram below follows a 2012 analysis by paleontologists Phil Senter, James I. Kirkland, Donald D. DeBlieux, Scott Madsen and Natalie Toth.

See also
 Timeline of dromaeosaurid research

References

"Expand and Life history of a basal bird: morphometrics of the Early Cretaceous Confuciusornis" Luis M Chiappe, Jesús Marugán-Lobón, Shu'an Ji & Zhonghe Zhou (2008)

External links
1.http://www.paleodb.org/cgi-bin/bridge.pl?a=basicTaxonInfo&taxon_no=143267
2.http://www.taxonsearch.org/dev/taxon_edit.php?tax_id=483&Action=View
3.http://theropoddatabase.blogspot.com/2010/03/article-1311-means-lewisuchinaeidae-is.html

Dromaeosaurs